Bagh-e Beyglari (also Romanized as Bāgh-e Beyglarī; also known as Beyglarī) is a village in Sar Firuzabad Rural District, Firuzabad District, Kermanshah County, Kermanshah Province, Iran. At the 2006 census, its population was 84, in 20 families.

References 

Populated places in Kermanshah County